
Gmina Wejherowo is a rural gmina (administrative district) in Wejherowo County, Pomeranian Voivodeship, in northern Poland. Its seat is the town of Wejherowo, although the town is not part of the territory of the gmina.

The gmina contains part of the protected area called Tricity Landscape Park.

Villages
Gmina Wejherowo contains the villages and settlements of Biała, Białasowizna, Bieszkowice, Bolszewo, Borowo, Burch, Cierżnia, Gacyny, Głodówko, Gniewowo, Góra, Gościcino, Gwizdówka, Kąpino, Kniewo, Kotłówka, Krystkowo, Łężyce, Małe Gowino, Marianowo, Miga, Młynki, Nowiny, Nowy Dwór Wejherowski, Orle, Paradyż, Pętkowice, Piecewo, Pińskie, Pnie, Polnica, Prajsów, Prymków, Pryśniewo, Reszki, Rogulewo, Sopieszyno, Sopieszyno-Wybudowanie, Ustarbowo, Warszkowo, Warszkowski Młyn, Wielkie Gowino, Wosów, Wygoda, Wyspowo, Zamostne, Zbychowo, Zielony Dwór and Zybertowo.

Neighbouring gminas
Gmina Wejherowo is bordered by the towns of Gdynia, Reda, Rumia and Wejherowo, and by the gminas of Gniewino, Krokowa, Luzino, Puck and Szemud.

References
Polish official population figures 2006

Wejherowo
Wejherowo County